Henry Christian Priestman (born 21 June 1955 in Kingston upon Hull, East Riding of Yorkshire, England) is an English rock singer, keyboardist, record producer and songwriter.

Biography
Priestman was educated at Woodleigh School, North Yorkshire and later the Quaker School, Leighton Park School in Reading and then went on to study Art at the Liverpool College of Art. In the late 1970s he played with the British power pop band, Yachts. Yachts supported The Who on their 1979 European tour. In 1980, Priestman was one of the co-founders of It's Immaterial. Although he had officially left the band by 1986, he played as a session musician on the hit single, "Driving Away From Home", and appeared with the band on Top of the Pops.

During the 1980s and 1990s he was a member of The Christians. Priestman has also been used as a session musician by both Bette Bright and Mike Badger. Priestman played keyboards on Badger's albums, Lo Fi Acoustic Excursions by Mike Badger & Friends (2004), The Onset (2005), and Lo Fi Electric Excursions by Mike Badger & Friends (2006).

Priestman was the producer of Mark Owen's 2003 Top 5 album, In Your Own Time. On 22 September 2008, Priestman released his debut solo album, The Chronicles of Modern Life, on Stiff Records. Artwork was made by Tobbe Stuhre. The album was a success, and Island Records bought the entire project for a major re-release. When Island Records picked up the album from Stiff, Priestman became the oldest artist to be signed to a major label for a debut solo album. He also wrote music for a digital age, including a James Bond Xbox game, BBC TV's Wildlife on One and Natural World. He has also written the music for numerous commercials.

He supported Fisherman's Friends in 2011, and played a slot at the Beverley Folk Festival in 2013. He continues to enjoy live work, and released his second album, The Last Mad Surge of Youth on 17 February 2014.

Priestman also composed the title song for the West End musical Dreamboats and Petticoats, and he wrote three songs for Graham Gouldman's 2012 album, Love and Work.

In 2015, he released his first solo live DVD entitled Settle Down, recorded live at Victoria Hall in Settle, Yorkshire.

Solo discography

The Chronicles of Modern Life
Album track listing:
 "Don't You Love Me No More"
 "Old"
 "What You Doin' with Me?"
 "It's Called a Heart"
 "Grey's the New Blonde"
 "He Ain't Good Enough for You"
 "The Idiot"
 "The Sacred Scrolls of Pop"
 "No to the Logo"
 "Did I Fight in the Punk Wars for This?"
 "It's What You Leave Behind"
 "Goodbye Mr. Lee (...And Thanks)"
 Hidden track: "Suffice to Say"

The Last Mad Surge of Youth
Album track listing:
 "At the End of the Day"
 "True Believer"
 "We Used to Be You"
 "Goodbye Common Sense"
 "Valentine Song"
 "In My Head"
 "The Last Mad Surge of Youth"
 "Rant 'N' Rave"
 "Huntin' and Gatherin' (Ain't What It Used to Be)"
 "Same Circus, Different Clowns"
 "I Cried Today"
 "A Pint of Bitter and Twisted, Please"
 "We Used to Be You (Part 2)"

References

External links
2004 interview with Henry Priestman 

1955 births
Living people
English male singers
English songwriters
English record producers
English keyboardists
Musicians from Kingston upon Hull
Alumni of Liverpool College of Art
Stiff Records artists
Proper Records artists
British male songwriters